Tiéfora is a town in the Tiéfora Department of Comoé Province in south-western Burkina Faso. It is the capital of Tiéfora Department, and the town has a population of 4,673.

References

External links
Satellite map at Maplandia.com

Populated places in the Cascades Region
Comoé Province